Musette Frances Jacqueline Natalie Majendie CBE (1903–1981) was the owner of  Hedingham Castle. In 1713 the castle was purchased by Sir William Ashhurst, after his death in 1720, the estate passed to his great granddaughter, the wife of Lewis Majendie. The Majendie family owned Hedingham Castle for 250 years until Miss Majendie left it to her cousin Thomas Lindsay.

Musette was a scout leader for many years with the keep serving as the scout hut and camps taking place in the grounds.

She was the granddaughter of Lewis Majendie MP.

In the last year of her life, from 1980 to 1981, she lived at Hedingham Castle with her close friend and companion, Margery Blackie. It has been speculated that Majendie and Blackie were lovers.

References

1903 births
1981 deaths
British landowners
Members of the Order of the British Empire